The Spikers' Turf 2nd Season Open Conference is the 4th conference of the Spikers' Turf, the Philippines' only men's indoor volleyball league in the country and the first conference for its second season. The open conference will start on May 28, 2016 at the Filoil Flying V Centre, San Juan. Six (6) volleyball clubs will compete in this year's Open Conference.

Participating Teams

Team Line-ups

Preliminary round
All preliminary round games of the conference will be held at the Filoil Flying V Centre, San Juan except matches on June 18 which will be held at the Blue Eagle Gym, Quezon City and on June 25 at the Philsports Arena, Pasig.

All times are Philippine Standard Time (UTC+08:00)

Playoff round

Semifinals

Rank 1 vs Rank 4
* Cignal HD Spikers (Rank #1) with twice-to-beat advantage

Rank 2 vs Rank 3
* Philippine Air Force Spikers (Rank #2) with twice-to-beat advantage

3rd place
 Sta. Elena Construction won the bronze medal.

Final

Awards

Most Valuable Player (Finals)
 Fauzi Ismail (Air Force)
Most Valuable Player (Conference)
 Greg Dolor (IEM)
Best Setter
Jessie Lopez (Air Force)
Best  Outside Spikers
Raymark Woo (Cignal)
Fauzi Ismail (Air Force)
Best Middle Blockers
Greg Dolor (IEM)
Herschel Ramos (Cignal)
Best Opposite Spiker
Rodolfo Labrador (Air Force)
Best Libero
Juvie Mangaring (Sta. Elena)

References

External links
 www.spikersturf.ph - Official website

Spikers' Turf
2016 in Philippine sport